Henry Alexander Patrick Sandrasagra (12 June 1875 – 29 September 1940) was a Ceylonese lawyer and member of the Legislative Council of Ceylon.

Early life and family
Sandrasagra was born on 12 June 1875. He was the son of J. N. Sandrasagra, Superintendent of Minor Roads, Jaffna. Sandrasagra was educated at St. Patrick's College, Jaffna.

Sandrasagra married Josephine, daughter of Simon Cherubim. They had a son (Wilfred) and two daughters.
He also had a son Ariaratnam from his first marriage.

Career
Sandrasagra joined the legal profession in 1898, working at the Jaffna Bar. He later moved to the Colombo Bar and was appointed King's Counsel in 1924.

Sandrasagra was president of the National Association and the Ceylon National Congress.

Later life
Sandrasagra was appointed to the Legislative Council of Ceylon in 1929. He died on 29 September 1940.

References

1875 births
1940 deaths
Alumni of St. Patrick's College, Jaffna
Members of the Legislative Council of Ceylon
People from Northern Province, Sri Lanka
Sri Lankan Tamil lawyers
Sri Lankan Tamil politicians